Gordon Grant may refer to:

 Gordon Grant (artist) (1875–1962), American artist
 Gordon Burton Grant (1911–2001), politician in Saskatchewan, Canada